Sea ice concentration is a useful variable for climate
scientists and nautical navigators.  It is defined as the area of
sea ice relative to the total at a given point in the ocean.
This article will deal primarily with its determination from remote sensing measurements.

Significance

Sea ice concentration helps determine a number of other important climate
variables.  Since the albedo of ice is much higher than that of water,
ice concentration will regulate insolation in the polar oceans.
When combined with ice thickness, it determines
several other important fluxes between the air and sea,
such as salt and fresh-water fluxes between the polar oceans
(see for instance bottom water) as well as
heat transfer between the atmosphere.
Maps of sea ice concentration can be used to determine
ice area and
ice extent, both of which are important
markers of climate change.

Ice concentration charts are also used by navigators to determine
potentially passable regions—see icebreaker.

Methods

In situ

Measurements from ships and aircraft are based on simply calculating
the relative area of ice versus water visible within the scene.
This can be done using photographs or by eye.
In situ measurements are used to validate remote sensing
measurements.

SAR and visible

Both synthetic aperture radar and visible sensors (such as Landsat)
are normally high enough resolution that each pixel is simply classified
as a distinct surface type, i.e. water versus ice.  The concentration can then be
determined by counting the number of ice pixels in a given area which
is useful for validating concentration estimates from lower resolution
instruments such as microwave radiometers.  Since SAR images are normally
monochrome and the backscatter of ice can vary quite considerably,
classification is normally done based on texture using groups of
pixels—see pattern recognition.

Visible sensors have the disadvantage of being quite weather sensitive—images are obscured by clouds—while SAR sensors, especially in the
higher resolution modes, have a limited coverage and must be pointed.
This is why the tool of choice for determining ice concentration is
often a passive microwave sensor.

Microwave radiometry

All warm bodies emit electro-magnetic radiation: see thermal radiation.
Since different objects will emit differently at different frequencies,
we can often determine what type of object we are looking at based on its emitted
radiation—see spectroscopy.  This principle underlies all passive
microwave sensors and most passive infrared sensors.  Passive is used in the
sense that the sensor only measures radiation that has been emitted by other
objects but does not emit any of its own.
(A SAR sensor, by contrast, is active.) SSMR and SSMI radiometers were flown on the Nimbus program and DMSP series of satellites.

Because clouds are translucent in the microwave regime, especially
at lower frequencies, microwave radiometers are quite weather insensitive.
Since most microwave radiometers operate along a polar orbit with
a broad, sweeping scan, full ice maps of the polar regions where
the swaths are largely overlapping can usually be obtained within one day.
This frequency and reliability comes at the cost of a poor resolution:
the angular field of view of an antenna is directly
proportional to the wavelength
and inversely proportional to the effective aperture area.
Thus we need a large deflector dish to compensate for a low frequency
.

Most ice concentration algorithms based on microwave radiometry
are predicated on the dual observation that: 1. different surface types
have different, strongly clustered, microwave signatures and
2. the radiometric signature at the instrument head is a linear
combination of that of the different surface types, with the weights
taking on the values of the relative concentrations.
If we form a vector space from each of the instrument channels
in which all but one of the signatures of the different surface types
are linearly independent, then it is straightforward to solve for
the relative concentrations:

where  is the radiometric signature at the
instrument head (normally measured as a brightness temperature),
 is the signature of the nominal
background surface type (normally water),
 is the signature of the ith
surface type while Ci are the relative
concentrations.

Every operational ice concentration algorithm is predicated on this
principle or a slight variation.
The NASA team algorithm, for instance, works by taking the
difference of two channels and dividing by their sum.
This makes the retrieval slightly nonlinear, but with
the advantage that the influence of temperature is mitigated.
This is because brightness temperature varies roughly linearly
with physical temperature when all other things are equal—see emissivity—and because the sea ice emissivity at different microwave
channels is strongly correlated.
As the equation suggests, concentrations of multiple ice
types can potentially be detected, with NASA team distinguishing between
first-year and multi-year ice (see image above).

Accuracies of sea ice concentration derived from passive microwave sensors may be expected to be on the order of 5\% (absolute).

A number of factors act to reduce the accuracy of the retrievals, the most obvious being variations in the microwave signatures produced by a given surface type.
For sea ice, the presence of snow, variations in salt and moisture content, the presence of melt ponds as well as variations in surface temperature will all produce strong variations in the microwave signature of a given ice type.  New and thin ice in particular will often have a microwave signature closer to that of open water.  This is normally because of its high salt content, not because of radiation being transmitted from the water through the ice—see sea ice emissivity modelling.
The presence of waves and surface roughness will change the signature over open water.  Adverse weather conditions, clouds and humidity in particular, will also tend to reduce the accuracy of retrievals.

See also
Arctic sea ice decline

References

External links
 High-resolution sea ice concentration charts derived from AMSR-E 89 GHz channel
 The Arctic ice sheet True color satellite map with daily updates.

Sea ice
Remote sensing
Radiometry